Mojtaba Mirzadeh (18 March 1946 – 17 July 2005) was an Iranian violin, kamancheh, and setar player who was influential in Persian classical music. He played, composed and arrangement music for many famous kurdish and Iranian singers such as Hasan Zirak, Mazhar Khaleqi, Hayedeh, Moein, Nader Golchin, Shahram Nazeri, Shahab Jezayeri, Googoosh, Mohammad-Reza Shajarian, Dariush Eghbali, Homeyra, Golpa, Alireza Eftekhari and Reza Saqaee. He was known by the music community as "the genius". Iranian classical and pop composer, Sadeq Nojooki says that Mirzadeh was the greatest musician that he ever saw in his life. He was also the composer for many films.

History
Mojtaba Mirzadeh was born on 18 March 1946 in the city of Ilam. At the age of 9 he moved to Kermanshah, Iran with his family. He later moved to Tehran. Mojtaba grew up in a poor family. He would make sounds from pans and pots in the kitchen when he was child. He then started to learn Santur, but quit shortly after learning it. When he was fourteen, his father offered to buy him a violin.

Death 
Mojtaba died from a heart attack on Sunday, 17 July 2005, aged 59.

Filmography 
 Nikah Halala (1971)
Doroshkechi (1971)
Mardi dar toofan (1972)
Dar Emtedade Shab (1978)
Dada (1983)

Albums 
Numerous tracks and albums including the following:
 Mojtaba Mirzadeh: Iranian Violin Improvising, (2007)
 Raz -e- Gol (Persian Traditional Music), (1994)
 Kurdish lullaby, composed, arranged and played by Mojtaba Mirzadeh, sung by Mazhar Khaleghi

External links

References

Iranian violinists
2005 deaths
1946 births
Burials at artist's block of Behesht-e Zahra
20th-century violinists
20th-century composers
Iranian setar players
Iranian kamancheh players
Kurdish musicians
Iranian classical musicians
Persian classical musicians
Musicians from Kermanshah
People from Kermanshah
Kurdish male artists
Kurdish film score composers
Iranian film score composers